Hannibal is an American psychological thriller television series developed by Bryan Fuller for NBC that aired for 39 episodes from April 4, 2013, until August 29, 2015.

The series is based upon characters and elements appearing in the novels Red Dragon (1981), Hannibal (1999), and Hannibal Rising (2006) by Thomas Harris. The series focuses on the budding relationship between FBI Special Agent Will Graham (Hugh Dancy), a crime scene investigator who holds the ability to empathize with psychopaths and murderers, and Dr. Hannibal Lecter (Mads Mikkelsen), a forensic psychiatrist and secret cannibal destined to become Graham's most cunning enemy. The FBI staff that supports Graham is headed by Special Agent in Charge Jack Crawford (Laurence Fishburne), who takes Graham from his teaching job to help investigate only the most gruesome and bizarre of murders, and includes a forensic team consisting of Beverly Katz (Hettienne Park), Brian Zeller (Aaron Abrams) and Jimmy Price (Scott Thompson). While Dr. Alana Bloom (Caroline Dhavernas) inadvertently slips deeper into Hannibal's world, clinical psychiatrist Dr. Bedelia Du Maurier (Gillian Anderson) does so purposefully, as does crime blogger Fredricka "Freddie" Lounds (Lara Jean Chorostecki), who frequently attempts to use Graham, Lecter, and their cases to make a name for herself.

Each episode of the first season is named after an element of French cuisine. The season two titles are named after the different elements of Japanese haute cuisine. The first seven of season three's episodes are named after different courses of Italian cuisine, the subsequent five are named for William Blake's series of The Great Red Dragon Paintings, and the finale's title is a phrase from Revelation 6:16.

Series overview

Episodes

Season 1 (2013)

Season 2 (2014)

Season 3 (2015)

Ratings

References

External links
 
 

Hannibal (TV series)
Lists of American drama television series episodes